Monira Akter Mithu is a Bangladeshi television and film actress.

Career
Mithu debuted her acting career in the television drama "Openty Bioscope" directed by Humayun Ahmed.

Works

Television dramas
 Openty Bioscope (2001)
 Nil Towale 
 Emon Deshti Kothao Khujey Pabey Nako Tumi
 Spartacus Ekattor
 House Full
 Bikol Pakhir Gaan
 Bua Bilash
 Coming Soon
 Putul Khela
 Chand Phool Omaboshya
 Choita Pagol
 Baatpar
 Terminal
 Moina Todonto
 Jhornar Gaan
 Char Dukone Char 
 Cheleti Abol Tabol Meyeti Pagol Pagol
 Bachelor Point
 Family Crisis
 Chan Biriyani
 Bibaho Hobe
 House No.96 (2021) 
 Family Crisis Reloaded
 Shanti Molom 10 Taka (2022)

Films
 Chandrokotha (2003)
 Amar Ache Jol (2008)
 Gohine Shobdo (2010)
 Meherjaan (2011)
 Poramon (2013)
 Jonakir Alo (2014)
 Bhaijaan Elo Re (2018)
 Dahan (2018)
 Bishwoshundori'' (2020)

Web series

Awards
 Meril Prothom Alo Award for Best TV Actress (2009)

References

External links
 

Living people
Bangladeshi television actresses
Bangladeshi film actresses
Date of birth missing (living people)
Place of birth missing (living people)
Year of birth missing (living people)
Best TV Actress Meril-Prothom Alo Critics Choice Award winners